American/Consolidated Tobacco Companies, also known as Domestic Tobacco Co., is set of two historic tobacco warehouses located at Lancaster, Lancaster County, Pennsylvania. It was built between 1907 and 1910, and are brick buildings on stone foundations. They are set parallel to one another, 25 feet apart. The south building is three stories tall and measures 70 feet wide by 220 feet deep. An addition was built about 1925, making the total depth 300 feet. The north building is two stories, 50 feet wide by 300 feet deep. It was expanded to its current size about 1925.

It was listed on the National Register of Historic Places in 1990.

See also
 American Tobacco Company

References

Industrial buildings and structures on the National Register of Historic Places in Pennsylvania
Industrial buildings completed in 1910
Industrial buildings completed in 1925
Buildings and structures in Lancaster, Pennsylvania
Tobacco buildings in the United States
National Register of Historic Places in Lancaster, Pennsylvania